Carlo Pietro Sigismund Righini (4 January 1870, Stuttgart - 24 October 1937, Zürich) was a Swiss painter and art association executive.

Biography 
He came from a family that included a long line of decorative painters, originating in Bedigliora. His father, Francesco (1837–1914), followed in the family tradition as well as being a master builder. His mother, Katharina Steinbrecher (1838–1925) was a native of Stuttgart. 

He attended school in Zürich. On the advice of Ottilie Roederstein, he left immediately after graduating (in 1888), and went to Paris, where he enrolled at the Académie Colarossi. His first instructor was Jean-André Rixens. While there, he met and became engaged to a fellow student, Constance Macpherson (1871–1957), from England. They were married in 1893. After stays in Italy and Ticino, they moved to Zürich.

Free from pressing financial obligations, he devoted himself entirely to his work. In 1898, he moved into a new studio, built by his father, where he produced still-lifes, portraits and nudes. He also worked in plein aire for a time, when he was flirting with impressionism. Later, he travelled extensively, visiting the Low Countries in 1903 and England in 1910. In 1904, he began to experiment with brighter patches of color; perhaps influenced by Cézanne and the Fauvists or his friends Giovanni Giacometti and Cuno Amiet. He showed his work at numerous exhibitions until around 1920, when he stopped painting to focus on his membership and executive positions in numerous art associations. During this time, he still did colored pencil drawings while otherwise unoccupied. 

After 1915, he was a member of the Federal Art Commission and served as its Vice-President from 1923 until his death. He was an indefatigable promoter of modern art in every position he held. Following World War I, the Federal Council commissioned him to oversee the importation of art works into Switzerland. This also became a life long assignment.
  
Much of his work is in private hands, but his estate is retained by the Stiftung Righini Fries of Zürich, established by Hanny Fries and her husband Beno Blumenstein (1924–2010). Some paintings are also to be seen at the Kunstmuseum Solothurn and the Kunsthaus Zürich.

References

Further reading 
 Rudolf Koella: Sigismund Righini, Maler, Zeichner, Kunstpolitiker. Offizin Verlag, Zürich 1993, .
 Katharina Fries-Righini: Wie die Tochter ihn sah : ein Erinnerungsbild. In: Rudolf Koella: Sigismund Righini, Maler, Zeichner, Kunstpolitiker. Offizin Verlag, Zürich 1993 ,
 Andrea Lutz and David Schmidhauser: Sigismund Righini, im Bann der Farbe, Museum Oskar Reinhart, Winterthur 2016 .
 Sigismund Righini, Willy Fries, Hanny Fries: eine Künstlerdynastie in Zürich, 1870-2009, Ed. by Sascha Renner; Verlag Scheidegger & Spiess, 2018  .

External links

 
 
More works by Righini @ ArtNet
Stiftung Righini-Fries

1870 births
1937 deaths
Swiss painters
Swiss-Italian people
Still life painters
Académie Colarossi alumni